Nocturnal is the seventh studio album by Spanish band Amaral. The songs were composed by Eva Amaral and Juan Aguirre, while the recording included the participation of Guillermo Quero as the sound and mixing engineer, Toni Toledo and Ged Lynch playing the drums, Chris Taylor on the bass and Tomás Virgos on the piano. Also, Nus Cuevas contributed an arrangement of strings, Abraham Boba played the organ for one of the songs, and John Calvert and David Antony Brinkworth, along with Eva and Juan themselves, undertook the synth programming. Eva Amaral and Juan Aguirre also took charge of the production, along with Chris Taylor.

It is the second album published under the label created by the duo, Discos Antártida. It went on sale on 30 October 2015 and includes 14 tracks. In the week of its release, it reached number one for bestselling albums in Spain and, on 18 December 2015, the album was recognised as a gold record after reaching 20,000 sales.

Track listing

Charts

Weekly charts

Year-end charts

Certifications

References 

2015 albums
Amaral (band) albums
Alternative rock albums by Spanish artists